Nelson José Murat Casab (born October 18, 1947) is a Mexican politician and a member of the Institutional Revolutionary Party. He was Governor of Oaxaca and is a Diputado Federal elected from the ranks of Alliance for Mexico of Institutional Revolutionary Party-Ecologist Green Party of Mexico. He is of Chaldean descent, born to an Chaldean family from the village of Tel Keppe, Iraq.

Murat was a controversial governor but a competent political speaker. After he assumed office on December 1, 1998 a series of scandals tarnished the governor's office.

Early life
He was born in Ciudad Ixtepec, Oaxaca, on October 18, 1949. He has a degree in Law, graduated from the Faculty of Law of the UNAM.

In his political career highlights his performance as a federal deputy in the legislatures XLIX, LI, LIV and LX, as senator of the Republic in the period 1994-1997. In both legislative chambers he was secretary of the Great Commission and of the Foreign Relations Commission. In the National Executive Committee of the PRI, he was secretary of International Relations and Director of the National School of Paintings. He has published several political reflection books among which stand out: Luz y Sombras de la realidad, Oaxaca, a diagnosis; The challenge of the transition, the renewal of the Mexican political system and the Pact for Mexico. The author has written several opinion articles in national newspapers such as: Excelsior, El Norte, La Jornada, El Financiero and El Universal. He was a member of the Governing Council of the Pact for Mexico.

Among the public positions he has held, he has been Federal Deputy for Oaxaca on four occasions, has served on the National Executive Committee of the PRI as Secretary of International Affairs, was director of the School of Paintings of the PRI, Secretary of Social Management, Secretary General Deputy and president of the State Executive Committee of the PRI in the State of Oaxaca. In the Chamber of Deputies he has served as President of the Foreign Relations Commission and as Secretary of the Great Commission, he has also been Senator of the Republic for the State of Oaxaca, he also served as Vice Coordinator of the PRI parliamentary faction and He has held the responsibility of the Vice Presidency of the Permanent Commission of the Congress of the Union. He has taught the Chair of Public International Law at the National School of Professional Studies (UNAM) and has published several articles in newspapers such as El Norte, El Financiero, La Jornada, Últimas Noticias de Excelsior, El Universal, among others.

He was married to Mrs. Ma. Guadalupe Hinojosa Cuellar, who presided over the State DIF and coordinated various social programs. On October 18, 2000, he died in Mexico City victim of cancer.

He participated in the important negotiations that led to the implementation of the Pact for Mexico and was appointed to be part of the Governing Council of the Pact for Mexico.

References

1949 births
Governors of Oaxaca
Mexican politicians of Assyrian descent
Living people
Members of the Senate of the Republic (Mexico)
Members of the Chamber of Deputies (Mexico)
Presidents of the Chamber of Deputies (Mexico)
Mexican people of Arab descent
Mexican people of Iraqi descent
21st-century Mexican politicians
National Autonomous University of Mexico alumni
Mexican people of Assyrian descent